Shree Rama Temple is Hindu temple situated in Triprayar in Thrissur district of Kerala state in India. The deity is Shree Rama and with four arms with bearing a conch, a disc, a bow and a garland. The temple is situated on the bank of river Theevra. The Temple deity is the presiding deity of Arattupuzha Pooram.

References

Hindu temples in Thrissur district